, is a Japanese pop singer and songwriter. In 1988, when she was attending college in Doshisha University, a Japanese pop band Tokyo Shōnen was formed in which she became the songwriter and vocalist. After the band broke up, she became a solo artist in 1993.

References

External links
  

Living people
Anime musicians
Doshisha University alumni
Japanese women pop singers
Japanese guitarists
Japanese women singer-songwriters
Musicians from Kyoto
20th-century Japanese women singers
20th-century Japanese singers
21st-century Japanese women singers
21st-century Japanese singers